Viacheslav Koleichuk (16 December 1941 – 8 April 2018) was a Russian sound artist, musician, architect and visual artist. Koleichuk mainly made installation art that involves tensegrity. Sometimes these sculptures function as an experimental musical instrument during performances. Some of his works are part of the collection of the Kolodzei Art Foundation. He was a member of (Lev Valdemarovich Nussberg's) kinetic art movement Dvizhenie in the 60s.

Bibliography
Realta sovietica, No. 173/174, Agosto-Settembre, 1967, p. 20–25
Dusan Conecny, Kinetizmus, (book), 1970, "Pallas", Bratislava
Dekorativnoje Iskusstvo, II/1980, pp. 3–11, Moscow
Environment and Planning B, 1980, Volume 7, Programmed Form Generation in Design, by V. Kolejchuk, Pion Limited, 1980, Great Britain
Vytvarna Kyltura, No.5, 1981, pp. 28–33, – Myslenky a modely Vjaceslava Kolejcuka, by M. Sokolov
INTERPRESSGRAFIC No. 4, 1986, pp. 8–13, Hungary, Self-collage, by V.Kolejchuk
Leonardo, Vol. 24, No. 1, 1991, pp. 41–47.
Vyacheslav Koleychuk: The Dvizheniye Group: Toward a Synthetic Kinetic Art. Leonardo, Vol. 27, No. 5,  1994, pp. 433–436.
Wind, World Interior Design, Winter 1991, No. 13, Japan, – V.Koleichuk
Retrospektive 1965–1990. Exhibition in Kassel
Photo Manifesto. Contemporary Photography in the USSR, (book), Stewart, Tabori & Chang edition, New York, 1991

Sources

 

1941 births
2018 deaths
Russian avant-garde
Sound artists
Soviet artists 
Soviet Nonconformist Art
People from Klinsky District